Faustulidae is a family of trematodes belonging to the order Plagiorchiida.

Genera

Genera:
 Allofellodistomum Yamaguti, 1971
 Antorchis Linton, 1911
 Bacciger Nicoll, 1914

References

Plagiorchiida